Holomatix Rendition is a discontinued raytracing renderer, which is broadly compatible with mental ray. Its rendering method is similar to that of FPrime in that it displays a continuously refined rendered image until final production quality image is achieved. This differs to traditional rendering methods where the rendered image is built up block-by-block.

It was developed by Holomatix Ltd, based in London, UK. As of December 2011, the Rendition product has been retired and is no longer available or being updated. The product is no longer mentioned on the developer's web site, either. The successor is SprayTrace.

Features 
Realtime (or progressive) rendering engine
Based on mental ray shader and lighting model
Supports 3rd-party shaders compiled for mental ray

Rendering Features 
As it uses the same shader and lighting model as mental ray, Rendition supports the same rendering and ray tracing features as mental ray, including:
Final Gather
Global Illumination (through Photon Mapping)
Polygonal and Parametric Surfaces (NURBS, Subdivision)
Displacement Mapping
Motion Blur
Lens Shaders

Supported platforms 

Autodesk Maya, up to and including 2011 SAP
Autodesk 3ds Max, up to and including 2010
SoftimageXSI, up to and including 2011, but not 2011 SP1

3D graphics software
Global illumination software
Rendering systems
3D rendering software for Linux